This list is of the Places of Scenic Beauty of Japan located within the Prefecture of Gunma.

National Places of Scenic Beauty
As of 1 August 2020, eight Places have been designated at a national level; Sanbaseki Gorge spans the prefectural borders with Saitama.

Prefectural Places of Scenic Beauty
As of 1 May 2019, five Places have been designated at a prefectural level.

Municipal Places of Scenic Beauty
As of 1 May 2019, twenty-seven Places have been designated at a municipal level.

See also
 Cultural Properties of Japan
 List of parks and gardens of Gunma Prefecture
 List of Historic Sites of Japan (Gunma)

References

External links
  Cultural Properties in Gunma Prefecture

Tourist attractions in Gunma Prefecture
Places of Scenic Beauty

ja:Category:群馬県にある国指定の名勝